Bourbon virus is an RNA virus in the genus Thogotovirus of the family Orthomyxoviridae, which is similar to Dhori virus and Batken virus. It was first identified in 2014 in a man from Bourbon County, Kansas, United States, who died after being bitten by ticks. The case is the eighth report of human disease associated with a thogotovirus globally, and the first in the Western hemisphere. As of May 2015, a case was  discovered in Stillwater, Oklahoma (the patient fully recovered) and relatively little is known about the virus. No specific treatment or vaccine is available. The virus is suspected to be transmitted by ticks or insects, and avoidance of bites is recommended to reduce risk of infection.  In June 2017 a 58-year-old female Missouri State Park employee died from an infection of the Bourbon virus after it had been misdiagnosed for a significant period of time.

Discovery
The virus was discovered in 2014 by Olga Kosoy, Amy Lambert and colleagues from the Centers for Disease Control and Prevention (CDC) in Fort Collins, Colorado, in a sample of blood from the case patient. Tests had previously ruled out a wide range of tick-borne diseases including anaplasmosis, babesiosis, ehrlichiosis, Q fever, Rocky Mountain spotted fever and tularemia. During tests for Heartland virus, a recently discovered Phlebovirus known to be transmitted by ticks, prominent plaques, or areas where the cells were affected by virus infection, were observed on one-cell-thick cultures of African green monkey kidney cells. The plaques did not resemble the effects of Heartland virus, and the researchers hypothesized that they were the work of another virus. Recently developed "next-generation" sequencing techniques were employed to find novel viral RNA sequences in cell culture supernatants, similar to viruses of the genus Thogotovirus, family Orthomyxoviridae. Lambert, who worked on the sequencing, explained that these "state-of-the-art" techniques could be used to identify pathogens that older technologies could not detect.

Next, real-time reverse transcription–polymerase chain reaction was used to confirm that this novel virus originated in the patient's blood sample. Finally, examining supernatants from the cell cultures under the electron microscope revealed virus particles of different shapes, including filaments and spheres. The virus was named "Bourbon virus" for the county in which it originated.

Virology
Bourbon virus is a type of thogotovirus, which is in the  RNA virus family Orthomyxoviridae. The virus particles show different morphologies, including filamentous and roughly spherical forms, and have projections from the surface. The spherical virions have a range of diameters, with broadly 100–130 nm being common. Virus was present at high levels in the extracellular space, with occasional particles being observed in the process of endocytosis. Like other members of the Orthomyxoviridae, the Bourbon virus genome is single-stranded, negative-sense RNA, which is segmented, or divided into a number of separate pieces. It has at least six segments. Bourbon virus is most similar in RNA sequence to Dhori virus and the closely related Batken virus, both members of the genus Thogotovirus, but has diverged substantially from these viruses. Dhori and Batken viruses have only been reported in the Eastern hemisphere.

Epidemiology
The Bourbon virus was first identified in a previously healthy man aged more than 50 years from Bourbon County, Kansas, United States, who worked as a farmer. He died in June 2014. Dana Hawkinson from the University of Kansas Hospital, where the patient was treated, has speculated that the virus had been previously present undetected. There have been five confirmed cases since 2014. The CDC is developing investigational diagnostic tests for Bourbon virus infection; as of December 2014, CDC and the Kansas Department of Health and Environment were planning to test blood samples from people in Kansas who have recently experienced similar unexplained symptoms. It is unknown whether the virus can infect non-human animals, and studies are ongoing to investigate this.

The case patient reported multiple tick bites, including a blood-filled tick in the shoulder area that was observed a few days before the onset of symptoms. Based on the history of the case patient, the virus is considered to be possibly tick-borne, but this has not been proven. Most thogotoviruses are transmitted solely by ticks, but the similar Batken virus has also been isolated from mosquitoes. Studies to establish the prevalence of Bourbon virus in tick and insect populations were planned in December 2014.

Signs and symptoms
The patient had high fever, headache, decreased appetite, muscle aches, joint pain, fatigue, malaise, nausea, vomiting, diarrhea and a maculopapular rash on the abdomen, chest and back. Late in the course of the illness he experienced shortness of breath, which developed into acute respiratory distress syndrome. He died from multiple organ failure 11 days after the earliest symptoms. Laboratory abnormalities observed included a decrease in the patient's white cell and platelet counts, considered to be caused by bone marrow suppression, and an increase in liver enzyme levels. These symptoms and alterations in blood cells are similar to those seen with tick-borne illnesses including ehrlichiosis and disease caused by the Heartland virus.

The degree, if any, to which the Bourbon virus contributed to the individual's illness and death remains unknown as of February 2015, as does whether these symptoms and laboratory abnormalities represent the typical course of infection with Bourbon virus. Hawkinson has speculated that there have been previous undiagnosed cases with milder symptoms from which the infected patients recovered.

Thogotoviruses rarely cause disease in humans. The case in Bourbon County is only the eighth report of human disease associated with a thogotovirus globally. Thogoto virus caused disease in two people from Nigeria, one of whom died; Dhori virus caused disease in five laboratory workers infected accidentally. Although another member of the genus Thogotovirus, Aransas Bay virus, has been found in seabird-associated ticks in the United States, this is the first reported case of human disease apparently associated with a thogotovirus in the Western hemisphere.

Treatment and prevention
No routine diagnostic test is yet available. There is currently no specific treatment or vaccine for the virus; supportive therapy is recommended. On the assumption that the virus is transmitted by a tick or insect, the main prevention method recommended is the avoidance of tick and insect bites.  In mice models, Favipiravir has been shown to be beneficial both therapeutically and prophylactically.

See also

 Tick-borne disease
 Emerging infectious disease

References

 
Orthomyxoviridae
Tick-borne diseases
Bourbon County, Kansas
2014 in science